Neolamprologus toae is a species of cichlid endemic to Lake Tanganyika.  This species reaches a length of  TL.  It can also be found in the aquarium trade.

References

toae
Taxa named by Max Poll
Fish described in 1949
Taxonomy articles created by Polbot